The Babai River originates in and completely drains Inner Terai Dang Valley of Mid-Western Nepal.  Dang is an oval valley between the Mahabharat Range and  Siwalik Hills  in its eponymous district.  Dang was anciently home to indigenous Tharu people and came to be ruled from India by the House of Tulsipur who also counted  as one of the  Baise Rajya—a confederation of 22 petty kingdoms in the Karnali (Ghagra) region.  About 1760 AD all these kingdoms were annexed by the Shah Dynasty during the unification of Nepal, except Tulsipur lands south of the Siwalik Hills were not taken.  Since Dang Valley was somewhat higher, cooler, better-drained and therefore less malarial than most of the country's Inner Terai, it was settled to some extent by Shah and Rana courtiers and other Paharis long before DDT was introduced to control the disease-bearing Anopheles mosquito.

Exiting Dang Valley and its district, the Babai enters Salyan District and flows between sub-ranges of the Siwalik Hills along their west-northwest axis. Sharada Khola drains about half of Salyan's larger Middle Hills region before cutting through the Mahabharat Range and joining the Babai from the right. Salyan was another Baise principality before unification. About  beyond this confluence, the Babai crosses into Bardiya District and enters Bardiya National Park. At this point  the river crosses Nepal's main east–west Mahendra Highway and exits the national park.

On the Outer Terai the Babai is finally free to gradually bend left toward the main inclination of the Indo-Gangetic Plain.

In Nepal the catchment of the Babai is bordered by that of the Rapti on the north, east and south; and by the main Ghaghra catchment on the west until their confluence.

In Season 9, Episode 55 of the television series River Monsters, Jeremy Wade visits Bardia National Park to fish the Babai.  He hoped to catch a large Goonch catfish but was unsuccessful.

Gallery

See also

List of rivers of Nepal

References

Rivers of Lumbini Province
Rivers of Uttar Pradesh
International rivers of Asia
Rivers of India